Régis Groisard (born 27 July 1973) is a French sprinter. He competed in the men's 4 × 100 metres relay at the 1996 Summer Olympics.

References

1973 births
Living people
Athletes (track and field) at the 1996 Summer Olympics
French male sprinters
Olympic athletes of France
Place of birth missing (living people)